The women's 200 metres at the 2022 European Athletics Championships will take place at the Olympiastadion on 18 and 19 August.

Records

Schedule

Results

Round 1
First 4 in each heat (Q) and the next 4 fastest  (q) advance to the Semifinals. The 8 highest ranked athletes received a bye into the semi-finals

Wind:Heat 1: +0.3 m/s, Heat 2: +0.9 m/s, Heat 3: +0.5 m/s

Semifinals
The twelve qualifiers from round 1 are joined by the eight highest ranked athletes who received a bye. 

First 2 in each semifinal (Q) and the next 2 fastest (q) advance to the Final.

Wind:Heat 1: -0.3 m/s, Heat 2: 0.0 m/s, Heat 3: +0.3 m/s

Final

Olympiastadion - 19 Aug - 22:22

References

200 W
200 metres at the European Athletics Championships
Euro